La Factoría was a Panamanian reggaeton and Reggae en Español group led by Marlen Romero better known by her stage name Demphra. Initially the group was formed by Marlen Romero (Demphra), Johanna Mendoza (Joysi Love), Edgardo Miranda (MC Joe) and Pablo Maestre (DJ Pablito). Eventually Joysi Love, Joey Montana and DJ Pablito left the group, however, Demphra carried on with the project for one more album.

History 
In 2002, Demphra joined Panama Music where she launched her first solo album, "La Willa Demphra". The disc was a complete success in her home country Panama including songs as: “El Muslo”, “Tilin Tilin”, “Ush”, among others. After the success of this album MC Joe, Goodfella, Joysi Love and DJ Pablito got together with Demphra and La Factoría was formed.

The group quickly became a Latin American phenomenon, hits like “Todavía”, “Que me Maten”, among others gave La Factoría several awards and a Gold disc for more than 200,000 sales of their first CD in Central and South America. In 2000 La Factoría launches “Más Allá” songs like: “No Lastimes Más” and “Ese Hombre es Mío” they became huge hits in Latin America.

Two years later DJ Pablito and MC Joe left the group. That same year La Factoría launched "Nuevas Metas" the album included smash hits like “Moriré”, “Dale”, “Como me Duele” and the #1 single “Perdóname” (feat. Eddy Lover). "Perdóname" became a huge hit giving the group several awards including a Platinum Disc for 100,000 digital downloads of the track.

In 2009, Joysi Love left the group but Demphra continued with the project and in 2010 she released her new album "Demphra", under the group name.

In 2013, Demphra left Panama Music, leaving the La Factoría name with the label, and keeping the name "Demphra".

It was announced that the group name would continue with other members.

Discography

Studio albums 

 2006: Nuevas Metas
 2009: Demphra

EP 

 2004: Más Allá

Compilation albums 

 2001: La Factoria

Singles

References

External links
Home Official Website
Instagram
Spotify
YouTube

Living people
Panamanian reggaeton musicians
Universal Music Latin Entertainment artists
20th-century Panamanian women singers
20th-century Panamanian singers
21st-century Panamanian women singers
21st-century Panamanian singers
Year of birth missing (living people)